Khost railway station is located in Balochistan, Pakistan.

See also
 List of railway stations in Pakistan
 Pakistan Railways

References

External links

Railway stations in Sibi District
Railway stations on Kandahar State Railway Line